Arthur Valentine Poole (28 April 1878 – 11 April 1955) was a cricketer who played first-class cricket for Southland from 1915 to 1921.

A middle-order batsman and occasional bowler, Arthur Poole played in six of the eight matches Southland played in their brief period as a first-class team. He made their highest-ever score, 77 in the first innings against Otago in 1914–15, as well as top-scoring with 38 in the second innings. In the first innings he hit two sixes and 11 fours and reached his 50 in 40 minutes. He also top-scored for Southland in their last first-class match, against the touring Australians in 1920–21.

His matches for Southland in non-first-class cricket extended from the match against Lord Hawke's XI in 1902–03 to the match against the touring Australians in 1927–28 just before he turned 50.

He married Ella Maude Sheppard at St John's Church in Invercargill on 12 November 1902.

References

External links

1878 births
1955 deaths
English emigrants to New Zealand
Southland cricketers
Cricketers from Birmingham, West Midlands